Teaser and the Firecat is the fifth studio album by Cat Stevens, released in October 1971. 

At the Australian 1972 King of Pop Awards the album won Biggest Selling LP.

Overview
The album contains 10 songs, including the hits "Morning Has Broken", "Moonshadow" and "Peace Train". It is also the title of a children's book written and illustrated by Stevens. The story features the title characters from the album cover, top-hatted young Teaser and his pet, Firecat, who attempt to put the moon back in its place after it falls from the sky. Published in 1972, the book has been out of print since the mid-1970s.

The album was a commercial success, surpassing the heights achieved by Stevens' previous album, Tea for the Tillerman, reaching both the UK and US top 3 and also spending fifteen weeks at the top of the Australian charts, becoming the biggest-selling album of the country in 1972.

In 1977 an animated version, narrated by comedian Spike Milligan, using the song "Moonshadow", was a segment in Fantastic Animation Festival. In November 2008, a "deluxe edition" was released featuring a second disc of demos and live recordings.

English keyboardist Rick Wakeman played piano on "Morning Has Broken" and English musician Linda Lewis contributed vocals on "How Can I Tell You".

Critical reception 

In a contemporary review for Rolling Stone magazine, music critic Timothy Crouse praised Stevens' distinctive musical style and introspective songs such as "Tuesday's Dead" and "The Wind", but felt that he lacks Van Morrison's evocative quality and James Taylor's refined lyrics: "Cat has become a dependable artist, a good artist, but he appears to be one of those composers who does not develop, who holds no surprises."

In a retrospective five-star review, AllMusic's William Ruhlmann found the album more simplistic lyrically and musically entertaining than Tea for the Tillerman (1970): "Teaser and the Firecat was the Cat Stevens album that gave more surface pleasures to more people, which in pop music is the name of the game."
It was voted number 539 in the third edition of Colin Larkin's All Time Top 1000 Albums (2000).

Track listing

Deluxe edition

Disc two

Personnel

Musicians

Cat Stevens – acoustic guitar, keyboards, vocals
Alun Davies – acoustic guitar, backing vocals
Larry Steele – bass guitar, congas
Gerry Conway – drums, percussion
Harvey Burns – drums, percussion
Linda Lewis – vocal on "How Can I Tell You"
Jean Alain Roussel - Hammond organ on Peace Train 
Andy Roberts (uncredited) – Kriwaczek string organ on "How Can I Tell You"
Rick Wakeman (uncredited) – piano on "Morning Has Broken" 
Andreas Toumazis – bouzouki on "Rubylove"
Angelos Hatzipavli – bouzouki on "Rubylove"
Del Newman – string arrangements

Technical
Cat Stevens - cover artwork
David Bailey - photography

Charts

Weekly charts

Year-end charts

Certifications

References

External links
 

Cat Stevens albums
1971 albums
Albums produced by Paul Samwell-Smith
Island Records albums
A&M Records albums
Concept albums
Albums recorded at Morgan Sound Studios